Noel David Glaves James known as Jimmy (1912-1993) was an English author and historian of forestry.  His works included:

 The Forester's Companion (1955)
 A Pictorial Guide to Bicton Gardens (1970)
 A History of English Forestry (1981)
 A Forestry Centenary: the history of the Royal Forestry Society of England, Wales, and Northern Ireland (1982)
 Plain Soldiering. A history of the armed forces on Salisbury Plain (1987)
 An Historical Dictionary of Forestry and Woodland Terms (1991)

References

1912 births
1993 deaths
20th-century English historians